Haroon Rahim (born 12 November 1949) is a Pakistani former tennis player. The former Pakistan and Asian No. 1, Rahim was the youngest tennis player ever to play for Pakistan in the Davis Cup at 15 years of age. He was also the highest ranking Pakistani tennis player (a career-high singles ranking of World No. 34 in October 1977). He led the UCLA team to victory with Jeff Borowiak and Jimmy Connors in 1970–71 and was 1971 NCAA doubles champion with Jeff Borowiak.

Rahim was from the Punjab city of Lahore, from a large family of avid tennis players. His father, Mir Abdur Rahim, was a civil servant who encouraged his children, sons and daughters, to play tennis. Four of Haroon's elder siblings; M. Nasim, M. Naeem, Zulficar and Shahnaz were also national tennis champions. His father loved tennis so much that he said he wanted to die on the tennis court. In 1968, he died of a heart attack while playing doubles with friends at the picturesque Mayo Gardens, Lahore.

Haroon Rahim was only the second Pakistani after Khawaja Saeed Hai to make it to Wimbledon's main draw. After reaching the Wimbledon Junior Boys singles quarterfinals twice (1965 and 1967) he went on to play in many Grand Slams, in both singles and doubles. Rahim won two ATP titles, the first at Little Rock against former Wimbledon runner up Alex Metreveli of the Soviet Union and then the second at Cleveland against Colin Dibley, both in 1976.

He also lost a final to Spanish US Open winner and French Open finalist Manuel Orantes.

He also won three doubles titles, at Oslo in 1974, North Conway in 1975, and Little Rock in 1978. In men's doubles at Grand Slam events he made it to the quarterfinals of the US Open, the third round of Wimbledon, and the second round of the French Open.
 
Haroon Rahim is the winner of one of the closest matches ever played when he beat Tom Gorman 6–7(3–5), 7–6(5–1), 7–6(5–4) at the Pennsylvania Grass Championships. As both players never lost their serve, each set went to a tie break with Haroon winning the match by just one point.

Last known to be in the U.S., Haroon retired from tennis at age 29, severed contact with his family, and his whereabouts are unknown.

Grand Slams performance timelines

Singles

Doubles

ATP career finals

Singles (2 titles, 3 runners-up)

Doubles (3 titles, 3 runners-up)

References

External links
 
 
 
 Haroon Rahim: The greatest tennis player Pakistan has ever produced

1949 births
Pakistani male tennis players
Tennis players from Lahore
UCLA Bruins men's tennis players
Living people